The 1990 European Curling Championships were held from 4 to 8 December at the Kristins Hall arena in Lillehammer, Norway.

The Swedish men's team won their third title, and the Norwegian women's team won their first title.

Men

Teams

First Phase (Triple Knockout)

Round 1
Two teams promoted to Second Phase

Round 2
Three teams promoted to Second Phase

Round 3
Three teams promoted to Second Phase

Second Phase (Double Knockout)

Round 1
Two teams promoted to Playoffs

Round 2
Two teams promoted to Playoffs

Placement Phase

Range 9-14

Range 5-8

Playoffs

Final standings

Women

Teams

First Phase (Triple Knockout)

Round 1
Two teams promoted to Second Phase.

Round 2
Three teams promoted to Second Phase.

Round 3
Three teams promoted to Second Phase.

Second Phase (Double Knockout)

Round 1
Two teams promoted to Playoffs.

Round 2
Two teams promoted to Playoffs.

Placement Phase

Range 9-13

Range 5-8

Playoffs

Final standings

References

External links

European Curling Championships, 1990
European Curling Championships, 1990
European Curling Championships
International curling competitions hosted by Norway
Sport in Lillehammer
December 1990 sports events in Europe